is a railway station on the Nippō Main Line operated by Kyūshū Railway Company in Usuki, Ōita, Japan.

Lines

Layout 
The station consists of a side platform serving a single track at grade. The station building is a timber structure of traditional Japanese design. It is unstaffed and serves only to house a waiting area and an automatic ticket vending machine. After the ticket gate, a short flight of steps leads up to the platform where a separate wooden shed is provided as a weather shelter.

Adjacent stations

History
Japanese Government Railways (JGR) opened the station on 18 July 1917 as an additional station on the existing track of what was then its Hōshū Main Line, subsequently renamed the Nippō Main Line on 15 December 1923. With the privatization of Japanese National Railways (JNR), the successor of JGR, on 1 April 1987, the station came under the control of JR Kyushu.

The station became unstaffed on 14 March 2015.

Passenger statistics
In fiscal 2016, the station was used by an average of 360 passengers daily (boarding passengers only), and it ranked 283rd among the busiest stations of JR Kyushu.

See also
List of railway stations in Japan

References

External links 

Kami-Usuki (JR Kyushu)

Railway stations in Ōita Prefecture
Railway stations in Japan opened in 1917